Yaroslav Khabarov (born March 5, 1989) is a Russian professional ice hockey defenceman who is currently playing for Metallurg Magnitogorsk of the Kontinental Hockey League (KHL). He has previously played for Amur Khabarovsk and HC Sibir Novosibirsk of the KHL. On March 3, 2014, Khabarov continued his first stint with Magnitogorsk, in agreeing to a two-year contract extension through 2016.

Career statistics

Awards and honors

References

External links

1989 births
Living people
Amur Khabarovsk players
Metallurg Magnitogorsk players
People from Magnitogorsk
Russian ice hockey defencemen
HC Sibir Novosibirsk players
Stalnye Lisy players
Sportspeople from Chelyabinsk Oblast